Xankəndi (also, Khankendi) is a village in the Ismailli Rayon of Azerbaijan.  The village forms part of the municipality of Zeyvə.

References

External links 

Populated places in Ismayilli District